Off or OFF may refer to:

Art and entertainment
Off (video game), a video game by Mortis Ghost.
Sven Väth, German DJ and singer who uses the pseudonym OFF
Off (album), by Ciwan Haco, 2006
Off! (album), by Off!
Off!, an American hardcore punk band
"Off", a song by Royce da 5'9" from Layers
"Off", a song by the American band Bright from their self-titled album
Our Favorite Family, a nickname for the Simpson family in the animated television series The Simpsons

Computing 
OFF (file format), for polygon meshes
Open Font Format
Owner-Free File System, a P2P network

Government and politics 
Offutt Air Force Base, near Omaha, Nebraska
Oil-for-Food Programme, the United Nations arrangement with Iraq in existence from 1995 to 2003
United States Office of Facts and Figures (OFF); see OWI (United States Office of War Information)

Other uses
Of, a city in Turkey
Off, spoiled, as in drinks and foods that have exceeded their shelf life 
Off side, one half of a cricket field
Off! (brand), an insect repellent
Open Food Facts, a crowdsourced database
 Over Flanders Fields, a 2005 combat flight simulation video game set in World War I;
Carol Off, Canadian journalist

See also
Offside (disambiguation)
ORF (disambiguation)
Orff (disambiguation)